Reid Ferguson (born March 24, 1994) is an American football long snapper for the Buffalo Bills of the National Football League (NFL). He played college football at LSU.

Professional career
Ferguson was signed by the Buffalo Bills as an undrafted free agent on May 2, 2016. He was waived on August 30, 2016. He was signed to the practice squad on November 2, 2016. He signed a reserve/future contract with the Bills on January 2, 2017. Ferguson was named the Bills starting long snapper for 2017, where he played in all 16 games.

On January 28, 2019, Ferguson signed a three-year contract extension with the Bills through the 2021 season.

On May 28, 2021, Ferguson signed another three-year contract extension with the Bills through the 2024 season.

In 2022, Ferguson became the longest active tenured Buffalo Bill upon defensive end Jerry Hughes signing with the Houston Texans.

Personal life
Ferguson has a brother, Blake Ferguson, who plays for the Miami Dolphins and also plays long snapper.

References

External links
LSU Tigers bio

1994 births
Living people
People from Buford, Georgia
Sportspeople from the Atlanta metropolitan area
Players of American football from Georgia (U.S. state)
American football long snappers
LSU Tigers football players
Buffalo Bills players